Borsig locomotive works can refer to:

The August Borsig Lokomotiv-Werke in Tegel, Berlin owned by August Borsig (before the 1930s)
The Borsig Lokomotiv Werke owned by AEG (after the early 1930s)